Shelby Millard Harrison (1881–1970) was a director of the Russell Sage Foundation, in charge of the Babe Ruth Foundation, as well as a writer.

Notable works 
 "Social Conditions In An American City: A Summary Of The Findings Of The Springfield Survey" (1920)
 "Welfare problems in New York, city which have been studied and reported upon during the period from 1915 through 1925"
 "Community action through surveys" (1916)
 "Social case workers and better industrial conditions" (1918)

Personal life 
Shelby Millard Harrison was born on February 15, 1881, in Leaf River, Illinois, a son of James Franklin and Mary Ellen (Helman) Harrison. He died in 1970 in New York City.

References

External links
 

1881 births
1970 deaths
American social scientists
American non-fiction writers
Writers from Illinois
People from Ogle County, Illinois